Melissa Jean Metcalf (born February 22, 1996 in Mesa, Arizona) is an American collegiate gymnast. During her club career, she trained at Desert Devils Gymnastics in Mesa, Arizona. She currently competes for the UCLA Bruins gymnastics team.

Personal life 
Metcalf was born on February 22, 1996, in Mesa, Arizona, to Mern and Laurie Metcalf. She has an older sister, Sheridan, who is a gymnast at the University of Washington.

In 2014, she graduated from Saguaro High School and started attending the University of California, Los Angeles.

Competitive history

Club career (2007-14) 
Melissa began competing at Level 10 in 2007, at the age of 11. She finished 4th at the 2007 Junior Olympic Nationals. In 2008, Metcalf tested for elite and qualified to the Visa National Championships. She finished 21st overall.

In 2009, she battled injuries but placed 1st and 3rd on bars and beam, respectively, at the 2009 Arizona States. She missed much of the 2010 season because of more injuries but managed to attend the Malibu Challenge as an elite gymnast.

For the 2011 season, Metcalf competed only on bars and beam and advance to the state championships on both events. She competed bars only during the 2012 season, attending three invitationals.

Metcalf bounced back from injuries to compete on all four events during the 2013 season. She won the all-around at both States and Regionals.

At the 2013 J.O. Nationals, she finished 5th all-around. In 2014, she won the all-around at States and placed 13th at Regionals, but did not advance to J.O. Nationals.

College career (2014-18) 
Metcalf started her collegiate career on the UCLA Bruins gymnastics team in Los Angeles, California. Her college debut came in 2015.

Prior to the 2016-17 season, Metcalf declared for a medical retirement from NCAA gymnastics. She remains a student at UCLA and remains affiliated with the gymnastics program as a team manager.

External links 
Official website
Gymdivas.us profile

References 

1996 births
American female artistic gymnasts
Sportspeople from Mesa, Arizona
Living people